Jetalliance Flugbetriebs GesmbH was a chartered airplane provider based in Oberwaltersdorf (near Vienna), Austria. It was established and started operations in 1996 and used to operate an extensive business jet network. Its main base was Vienna International Airport.   .

History 
The airline operated under JAR OPS 1 in Europe, but was also FAA part 129 certified, allowing it to fly commercially in the US and Canada. 

In December 2005, a Dassault Falcon 2000 joined the growing fleet of Jetalliance when it was delivered new from the manufacturer  In 2006 Jetalliance has a fleet of 37 aircraft.. In 2006 it announced orders for an Airbus A319 Corporate Jet and an Airbus A318 Elite aircraft. In January 2006 the airline announced an order for 28 jets from the Cessna Citation family. Jetalliance has ordered two further Airbus A318 Elite aircraft (following the initial order for a single aircraft in June 2006) and will configure them with a 14-seat interior.

In November 2012, the company filed for bankruptcy, the claims amounted to approximately €28.9 mio. In October 2013, it was decided to close down and liquidate the company.

Fleet
The Jetalliance fleet included the following aircraft (as of 10 September 2008):

2 Bombardier Challenger 850
1 Bombardier Learjet 60
3 Cessna CitationJet
1 Cessna Citation Ultra
3 Cessna Citation X
3 Cessna Citation XLS
1 Dassault Falcon 50EX
1 Dassault Falcon 900B
2 Dassault Falcon 2000
2 Embraer ERJ-135 Legacy
1 Gulfstream G550
1 Gulfstream GIV
1 Raytheon Beechjet 400A

On order 
3 Airbus A318 Elite
1 Airbus A319CJ
2 Cessna Citation X

Previously operated
The airline operated the following aircraft in 2005: 
1 Bombardier Learjet 45
1 Dornier 328JET
1 Gulfstream V
1 McDonnell Douglas MD-83
2 Raytheon Beechjet 400A

See also
JetAlliance Racing

References

External links 

Jetalliance

Defunct airlines of Austria
Airlines established in 1996
Airlines disestablished in 2013
2013 disestablishments in Austria
Austrian companies established in 1996
Economy of Lower Austria